Makers Academy (Makers) is a 16-week computer programming bootcamp in London. It was founded by Rob Johnson and Evgeny Shadchnev in December 2012.

Programme
Makers Academy (Makers) takes students with varying levels of prior experience computer programming and teaches them the fundamentals of web development. The aim is to help students develop the necessary skills to secure a role as a junior developer upon graduation. The course covers professional web development technologies such as Ruby on Rails, HTML5, CSS, JavaScript, jQuery, SQL, Ajax and softer skills, including Object-oriented design, Test Driven Development, Agile Methodology and version control with Git. The main course is preceded by a 4-week, part-time, online 'pre-course', which students have to complete first. The application process is highly selective, and the average student has a number of years of prior work experience before applying. Makers offers a limited number of free places to those who cannot afford to pay the usual £8,500 fee (US$8,300)  through scholarships and through free places, funded by the Department for Education's Skills Bootcamp programme.  

The program adopts a "learn by doing" approach, achieved largely through self-directed, project-based work. Students are encouraged to work in pairs on practical coding challenges, with weekly tests, culminating in a final project which is presented to hiring partners on "Demo Day". The organisation claims to support 100% of its graduates into jobs, though data to verify this claim is not publicly available. The students who have graduated are often put forward for roles by the Academy, which has relationships with employers like Marks & Spencer, Sky, The Financial Times and Deloitte Digital.

Reception
Makers Academy has been featured on Sky News, in The Guardian, The Independent, Tech City News, Forbes, MadeInShoreditch, ComputerWeekly, StartupBook, and TechWeekEurope.

References

External links
 Makers Academy Site
 Makers Academy on Twitter

Education in the London Borough of Islington
Computer programming
Training programs